Orthetrum kristenseni is a species of dragonfly in the family Libellulidae. It is endemic to Ethiopia.  Its natural habitats are subtropical or tropical high-altitude grassland, rivers, and swamps. It is threatened by habitat loss.

References

Endemic fauna of Ethiopia
Libellulidae
Insects of Ethiopia
Taxonomy articles created by Polbot
Insects described in 1911